According to the Registrar of Newspapers for India, there are 1,10,851 registered publications in India as of 31 March 2016. This is a list of the newspapers in India by readership according to the Indian Readership Survey (IRS) Q4 2019.

Readership vs Circulation
Readership figures tend to estimate the number of people who actually read the news paper, vis a vis circulation figures that try to estimate the number of copies sold. Typically, readership tends to be 2.5 times circulation, though this may be higher or lower depending on individual cases.

Note: The details specified on this page may not be up to date.

Methodology 

These figures are compiled by Media Research Users Council (MRUC) in the Indian Readership Survey (IRS) Q4 2019.

List of newspapers

See also

 List of newspapers in India
 List of Indian newspapers by circulation

References

External links
 Hindi News portal

India
 
Newspapers by circulation